Gomphogaster is a fungal genus in the family Gomphidiaceae. Circumscribed in 1972 by American mycologist Orson K. Miller, Jr., the genus is monotypic, containing the single gasteroid species Gomphogaster leucosarx, found in the United States.

References

External links
 

Boletales
Monotypic Boletales genera